The innocent prisoner's dilemma, or parole deal, is a detrimental effect of a legal system in which admission of guilt can result in reduced sentences or early parole. When an innocent person is wrongly convicted of a crime, legal systems which need the individual to admit guilt — as, for example, a prerequisite step leading to parole — punish an innocent person for their  integrity, and reward a person lacking in integrity. There have been cases where innocent prisoners were given the choice between freedom, in exchange for claiming guilt, and remaining imprisoned and telling the truth. Individuals have died in prison rather than admit to crimes that they did not commit.

United States law professor Daniel Medwed says convicts who go before a parole board maintaining their innocence are caught in a catch-22 that he calls "the innocent prisoner’s dilemma". A false admission of guilt and remorse by an innocent person at a parole hearing may prevent a later investigation proving their innocence.

Detriment to individuals

In the United Kingdom
Michael Naughton, founder of the Innocence Network UK (INUK), says work carried out by the INUK includes research and public awareness on wrongful convictions, which can affect policy reforms. Most important is the development of a system to assess prisoners maintaining innocence, to distinguish potentially innocent prisoners from the prisoners who claim innocence for other reasons like "ignorance, misunderstanding or disagreement with criminal law; to protect another person or group from criminal conviction; or on 'abuse of process' or technical grounds in the hope of achieving an appeal." The system, he says, is being adopted by the prison parole board and prison service for prisoners serving "indeterminate sentences (where the prisoner has no release date and does not get out until a parole board decides he or she is no longer a risk to the public). Previously, such prisoners were treated as 'deniers' with no account taken of the various reasons for maintaining innocence, nor the fact that some may actually be innocent." Those prisoners are unable to achieve parole unless they undertake offence-behaviour courses that require the admission of guilt as a prerequisite. This was represented in the Porridge episode Pardon Me.  However, in recent years, this has diminished in significance; at the time Simon Hall ended his denials to murder in 2012, the Ministry of Justice denied that this would have any impact on his tariff, and his last online posting had been concerned with being released from prison in spite of his denials.

The murder of Linda Cook was committed in Portsmouth on 9 December 1986. The subsequent trial led to a miscarriage of justice when Michael Shirley, an 18-year-old Royal Navy sailor, was wrongly convicted of the crime and sentenced to life imprisonment. After serving the minimum 15 years, Shirley would have been released from prison had he confessed the killing to the parole board, but he refused to do so and said: "I would have died in prison rather than admit something I didn't do. I was prepared to stay in forever if necessary to prove my innocence." Shirley's conviction was eventually quashed by the Court of Appeal in 2003, on the basis of exculpatory DNA evidence.

The Stephen Downing case involved the conviction and imprisonment in 1974 of a 17-year-old council worker, Stephen Downing, for the murder of a 32-year-old legal secretary, Wendy Sewell. His conviction was overturned in 2002 after Downing had served 27 years in prison. The case is thought to be the longest miscarriage of justice in British legal history, and it attracted worldwide media attention. The case was featured in the 2004 BBC drama In Denial of Murder. Downing claimed that had he falsely confessed he would have been released over a decade earlier. Because he did not admit to the crime, he was classified as "IDOM" (In Denial of Murder) and ineligible for parole under English Law.

In the United States

In the United States the reality of a person being innocent, called "actual innocence", is not sufficient reason for the justice system to release a prisoner. Once a verdict has been made, it is rare for a court to reconsider evidence of innocence that could have been presented at the time of the original trial. Decisions by the State Board of Pardons and Paroles regarding its treatment of prisoners who may be actually innocent have been criticized by the international community.

Herbert Murray, who was convicted of murder in 1979, said, "When the judge asked me did I have anything to say, I couldn't say, because tears were coming down and I couldn’t communicate. I couldn't turn around and tell the family that they got the wrong man." The judge said he believed the defense's alibi witnesses; however, the judge was required by law to respect the jury's decision. After being locked up for 19 years, his parole officer said "Nineteen years is a long time. [....] But you’re no closer to the rehabilitative process than when you first walked into prison. The first step in that process is the internalization of guilt. You need to do some serious introspection, Mr. Murray, and come to grips with your behavior." Murray agreed with the parole officer but maintained his innocence: "I agree! But again, I just didn't do it."

In a news interview, Murray says he went before a parole board four times, maintaining his innocence until the fifth time: "I said what the hell, let me tell these people what they want to hear." He admitted to the parole board that he committed the crime and was taking responsibility. "I felt like I sold my soul to the devil. Because before, I had that strength, because I stood on the truth. [...] I became so desperate to get out, I had to say something. I had to say something because what I said before didn't work." His parole was denied. After 29 years in prison, Medwed's Second Look clinic, a group dedicated to the release of innocent prisoners, assisted lawyers in his eighth parole board hearing which was successful, releasing him onto indefinite parole. However, overturning the original conviction would be hampered by his admissions of guilt at his parole hearings.

Timothy Brian Cole (1960–99) was an African American military veteran and a student wrongly convicted of raping a fellow student in 1985. Cole was convicted by a jury of rape, primarily based on the testimony of the victim, Michele Mallin. He was sentenced to 25 years in prison. While incarcerated, Cole was offered parole if he would admit guilt, but he refused. "His greatest wish was to be exonerated and completely vindicated", his mother stated in a press interview. Cole died after serving 14 years in prison.

Another man, Jerry Wayne Johnson, confessed to the rape in 1995. Further, Mallin later admitted that she was mistaken as to the identity of her attacker. She stated that investigators botched the gathering of evidence and withheld information from her, causing her to believe that Cole was the perpetrator. Mallin told police that the rapist smoked during the rape. However, Cole never smoked because of his severe asthma. DNA evidence later showed him to be innocent. Cole died in prison on December 2, 1999; ten years later, a district court judge announced "to a 100 percent moral, factual and legal certainty" that Timothy Cole did not commit the rape. He was posthumously pardoned. 

The dilemma can occur even before conviction. Kalief Browder was arrested in May 2010 for allegedly stealing a backpack. He spent the next three years on Rikers Island awaiting trial, much of it in solitary. During court appearances, prosecutors routinely asked for a short delay which would turn into a much lengthier wait. At times, Browder was offered plea bargains, and at one point, he was encouraged to plead guilty to misdemeanors, for which he would be sentenced to time already served and released. When he refused the plea deal, insisting on his innocence, the judge noted "If you go to trial and lose, you could get up to fifteen [years]." Eventually, in May 2013, the case was dismissed because prosecutors had lost contact with the only witness they had to the alleged crime.

Detriment to society
Gabe Tan reported a British conference in 2011, "the dilemma of maintaining innocence", concluded "Denial is not a valid measure of risk. In fact, research has shown that prisoners who openly admit to their crimes have the highest risk of re-offending."

In 2011, Michael Naughton suggested the focus on new evidence by the Criminal Cases Review Commission, rather than an examination of serious problems with evidence at original trials, meant in many cases “that the dangerous criminals who committed these crimes remain at liberty with the potential to commit further serious crimes.”

Robert A. Forde cited two studies at the conference. One, a ten-year study of 180 sex offenders by Harkins, Beech and Goodwill found prisoners who claimed to be innocent were the least likely to be re-convicted, and that those who 'admitted everything', claiming to be guilty, were most likely to re-offend. He also told the conference research by Hanson et al. in 2002, the denial by the prisoner of their offences had no bearing on their likelihood of re-offend.

See also

Alternative pleading
 Recidivism
 List of wrongful convictions in the United States

References

External links
 New York Times video about the Herbert Murray case

Penal imprisonment
Parole
Dilemmas
Wrongful convictions